Craig McLean (born 25 October 1998) is a British swimmer from Livingston, Scotland. McLean attended Deans Community High School before subsequently attending the University of Stirling. McLean made his senior debut for Scotland at the 2018 Commonwealth Games while making his debut for Great Britain at the 2018 European Championships.

Career
McLean won silver in the boys' 100m freestyle at the 2015 Commonwealth Youth Games.

As a  senior, he represented Scotland at the 2018 Commonwealth Games in Gold Coast, where he won a bronze medal in the men's 4 × 100 metre freestyle relay.

At the 2018 European Championships, McLean was part of the British team that won bronze in the mixed 4 × 200 metre freestyle relay, a new event at the game.

References

External links
Craig McLean at British Swimming

1998 births
Living people
British male swimmers
Sportspeople from Livingston, West Lothian
Commonwealth Games medallists in swimming
Commonwealth Games bronze medallists for Scotland
British male freestyle swimmers
European Aquatics Championships medalists in swimming
Swimmers at the 2018 Commonwealth Games
Medallists at the 2018 Commonwealth Games
Scottish male freestyle swimmers